is a Japanese manga series written and illustrated by Non Tamashima. It started serialization in Dessert. As of August 2022, 13 volumes have been released. A live-action film adaptation has also been released.

Media

Manga
The series is written and illustrated by Non Tamashima. It started serialization in Dessert on May 24, 2016. In June 2020, it was revealed the series was going on hiatus for "a little while". As of August 2022, 13 tankōbon volumes have been released.

In December 2017, Kodansha USA announced they licensed the series digitally.

Volume list

Film
A live-action film adaptation was announced on February 19, 2022. It was directed by Shōsuke Murakami, scripted by Junpei Yamaoka, and distributed by Shochiku. Snow Man member Hikaru Iwamoto and Meru Nukumi played the lead roles. It  premiered on July 8, 2022.

Reception
Rebecca Silverman from Anime News Network praised the first volume for its romance and emotional moments, while criticizing it for having "uncomfortable daddy issues". She also criticized the art for its drawings of torsos. Christel Scheja from Splash Comics also offered praise for the story, while disagreeing with Silverman over the art, stating the artist "[had] a good eye for details".

References

External links
 Official website 
 

Firefighting in fiction
Kodansha manga
Manga adapted into films
Romance anime and manga
Shōjo manga
Japanese romance films